Enzo Giovanni Ferrari Lasnibat (born 1 September 1979) is a Chilean football manager and former footballer who played as a centre-back for clubs in Chile and abroad.

Club career
A product of Colo-Colo and Palestino youth systems, Ferrari played for the second from 1997 to 2002, with a stint on loan at Constitución Unido in the Chilean Tercera División. In 2003, he played for Deportes Puerto Montt, also in the Chilean top division.

In 2004, he moved to Canada and joined Edmonton Aviators alongside his compatriots Jaime Lo Presti and Claudio Salinas.

In 2005, he emigrated to Europe and joined the Lithuanian side Sūduva Marijampolė in the A Lyga after a trial with Swiss side AC Bellinzona. In Sūduva Marijampolė, he coincided with the Italian coach Rino Lavezzini.

From 2005 to 2014, he played for several clubs in the Eccellenza Liguria such as Virtus Entella, Finale FC, Imperia, Navajo, among others.

Back in Americas, he played for Boca Raton FC in the APSL in the 2014–15 season.

Coaching career
In Italy, he worked as coach of the youth systems at the same time he was a player, for both Finale FC and ASD Carcarese. After getting an offer from the United States, in 2014 he joined Boca Raton FC as coach of the youth system, performing also as a player.

In his homeland, he worked for Colo-Colo youth system in Lo Prado commune from 2017 to 2019.

References

External links
 
 Enzo Ferrari at FootballDatabase.eu
 

1979 births
Living people
People from Marga Marga Province
Chilean people of Italian descent
South American people of Yugoslav descent
Chilean footballers
Chilean expatriate footballers
Chilean Primera División players
Club Deportivo Palestino footballers
Puerto Montt footballers
Tercera División de Chile players
A-League (1995–2004) players
Edmonton Aviators / F.C. players
A Lyga players
FK Sūduva Marijampolė players
Eccellenza players
Virtus Entella players
American Professional Soccer League players
Boca Raton FC players
Chilean expatriate sportspeople in Canada
Chilean expatriate sportspeople in Lithuania
Chilean expatriate sportspeople in Italy
Chilean expatriate sportspeople in the United States
Expatriate soccer players in Canada
Expatriate footballers in Lithuania
Expatriate footballers in Italy
Expatriate soccer players in the United States
Association football defenders
Chilean football managers
Chilean expatriate football managers
Expatriate football managers in Italy
Expatriate soccer managers in the United States